Kiliyanur is a village in Villupuram district, Tamil Nadu, India.

Geography
It is located at at

an elevation of 17 m from MSL.

Location
ECR passes through Kiliyanur. Nearest airport is Trichy International Airport.

Adjacent communities

References

External links
 Satellite map of Kiliyanur
 About Kiliyanur

Cities and towns in Viluppuram district